The in Sound is a 1965 album by jazz arranger and vibraphonist Gary McFarland.

Reception
Douglas Payne reviewed the album for AllMusic writing that the album was "chock full of brief, enjoyable tunes that stick with you. Guitarist Gabor Szabo is a perfect partner and makes a memorable combination with McFarland's mellifluous vibraphone" and that it was a "more comfortable mix of McFarland's vocalese pop and jazz than the more successful Soft Samba".

The initial Billboard magazine review from December 4, 1965, commented that McFarland "knows that musicianship has to broadened to include humor and an awareness of the current mood to develop listener rapport. He does just that in this outstanding package that features some highly original and attractive material as well as a number of key sidemen who know what he's trying to say and help him say it".

Track listing
 "The Moment of Truth" (Piero Piccioni) – 4:07
 "Bloop Bleep" (Frank Loesser) – 2:15
 "The Hills of Verdugo" (Gary McFarland) – 3:52
 "Over Easy" (McFarland) – 3:05
 "Here I Am" (Hal David, Burt Bacharach) – 2:10
 "Fried Bananas" (McFarland) – 4:30
 "The Sting of the Bee" (Nino Oliviero, Bruno Nicolai, Alan Brandt) – 3:50
 "Wine and Bread" (McFarland) – 3:10
 "I Concentrate on You" (Cole Porter) – 2:50
 "(I Can't Get No) Satisfaction" (Mick Jagger, Keith Richards) – 2:00

Personnel
Gary McFarland – arranger, vibraphone, vocals
Bob Brookmeyer – trombone
Sadao Watanabe – tenor saxophone, flute
Spencer Sinatra – flute
Gábor Szabó, Kenny Burrell – guitar
Joe Venuto, Willie Rodriguez – percussion
Richard Davis, Bob Bushnell – double bass
Candido – bongos, congas
Grady Tate, Sol Gubin – drums

Production
Creed Taylor – producer
Win Bruder – cover design
Peter Shulman – cover painting
Rudy Van Gelder – engineer
Val Valentin – director of engineering

References

1965 albums
Albums arranged by Gary McFarland
Albums produced by Creed Taylor
Albums recorded at Van Gelder Studio
Gary McFarland albums
Instrumental albums
Verve Records albums